The Best Little Whorehouse in Texas is a musical with a book by Texas author Larry L. King and Peter Masterson and music and lyrics by Carol Hall. It is based on a story by King that was inspired by the real-life Chicken Ranch in La Grange, Texas.

Synopsis
It is the late 1970s, and a brothel has been operating outside of fictional Gilbert, Texas (based on La Grange) for more than a century. It is currently under the proprietorship of Miss Mona Stangley, who inherited it from the original owner Miss Wulla Jean. While taking care of her girls, she is also on good terms with the local sheriff, Ed Earl Dodd, and donates to the greater community. When crusading television reporter Melvin P. Thorpe (based on real-life Houston news personality Marvin Zindler) decides to publicize the illegal activity, the ensuing political ramifications eventually cause the business to be closed down.

Principal casts

Production history
The Best Little Whorehouse in Texas opened off-Broadway at the Entermedia Theatre on April 17, 1978. It reopened on Broadway at the 46th Street Theatre on June 19, 1978, and ran for 1,584 performances. The production was directed by Peter Masterson and Tommy Tune and choreographed by Tune and Thommie Walsh. The opening cast included Carlin Glynn, Henderson Forsythe, Jay Garner, Joan Ellis, Delores Hall, and Pamela Blair. Glynn was replaced by Fannie Flagg and Anita Morris later in the run.  Alexis Smith starred as Miss Mona in the first U.S. National Tour, September 1979 through February 1981, with stops in major cities from Boston to Los Angeles.

The Sydney production opened at Her Majesty's Theatre on 13 September 1980. Produced by J. C. Williamson Ltd, it starred Lorraine Bayly as Miss Mona and Alfred Sandor as Sherriff Ed Earl Dodd, with Mona Richardson as Jewel, Judi Connelli as Doatsy Mae and Peter Whitford as the Governor.

The West End production opened at the Theatre Royal, Drury Lane on February 26, 1981. Produced by Bernard Delfont, it again starred Carlin Glynn and Henderson Forsythe, with Miquel Brown as Jewel and Betsy Brantley as Angel. It included Sally Ann Triplett and Robert Meadmore and ran for 204 performances.

A "summer stock" production that toured the northeastern U.S. in 1982 starred Barbara Eden, William Hardy and Jay Garner.

In what was described as "a return engagement", the show opened on Broadway at the Eugene O'Neill Theatre on May 31, 1982, and closed on July 24, 1982, after nine previews and 63 performances. The cast featured Carlin Glynn and Delores Hall.<ref>{{cite web |url=https://www.playbillvault.com/Show/Detail/4712/The-Best-Little-Whorehouse-in-Texas |title=The Best Little Whorehouse in Texas 1982 Listing |website=PlayBillVault.com |access-date=July 25, 2012 |archive-url=https://web.archive.org/web/20121202170123/http://www.playbillvault.com/Show/Detail/4712/The-Best-Little-Whorehouse-in-Texas |archive-date=2012-12-02 |url-status=dead }}</ref>

A short-lived sequel entitled The Best Little Whorehouse Goes Public was staged on Broadway in 1994.

"The Aggie Song" was performed on the Tony Awards broadcast, but was heavily censored because of the nature of the lyrics and choreography.

A U.S. National Tour starring Ann-Margret opened on February 14, 2001.

A benefit concert took place on October 16, 2006, to benefit the Actor's Fund. The concert was directed by Mark S. Hoebee and choreographed by Denis Jones. The cast included Terrence Mann (as Sheriff Ed Earl Dodd), Emily Skinner, and Jennifer Hudson.

Song list

 Act I
 "Prologue" – The Rio Grande Band Leader and the Rio Grande Band
 "20 Fans" – Company
 "A Lil' Ole Bitty Pissant Country Place" – Mona Stangley and the Girls
 "Girl, You're a Woman" – Mona Stangley, Shy, Jewel and the Girls
 "Watch Dog Theme" – The Dogettes
 "Texas Has a Whorehouse in It" – Melvin P. Thorpe, the Thorpe Singers and the Dogettes
 "Twenty Four Hours of Lovin'" – Jewel and the Girls
 "Watch Dog Theme" (Reprise) – The Dogettes
 "Texas Has a Whorehouse in It" (Reprise) – Melvin P. Thorpe and the Dogettes
 "Doatsy Mae" – Doatsy Mae
 "Angelette March" – Angelette Imogene Charlene and the Angelettes
 "The Aggie Song" – The Aggies
 "The Bus from Amarillo" – Mona Stangley

 Act II
 "The Sidestep" – The Governor of Texas & Company
 "No Lies" – Mona Stangley, Jewel and the Girls
 "Good Old Girl" – Sheriff Ed Earl Dodd and the Aggies
 "Hard Candy Christmas" – The Girls
 "Finale" – Company

"The Bus from Amarillo" was moved to the final scene, sometime late in the run of the original production and has generally played that way ever since.

Awards and nominations

Original Broadway production

Discography
 The Best Little Whorehouse in Texas: original cast. LP with gatefold jacket. MCA, 1978. MCA-3049. Cassette as MCAC-3049.
 The Best Little Whorehouse in Texas: original cast.  Audio CD.   MCA, 1997.  MCAD-11683; MCA-3049.
 Best Little Whorehouse in Texas: New cast recording.  Audio CD.  Fynsworth Alley/Varèse Sarabande, 2001. 302 062 117 2.

References

Bibliography
 Hall, Carol.  Vocal selections from The Best Little Whorehouse in Texas. Melville, N.Y.: MCA Music, 1979.
 King, Larry L., and Masterson, Peter.  The Best Little Whorehouse in Texas. Music and lyrics by Carol Hall. French's Musical Library. New York, N.Y.: S. French, 1978. .
 King, Larry L.  The Whorehouse Papers''.  New York: Viking Press, 1982. .

External links
 
 Licensing Information from Samuel French, Inc.
 Plot summary & character descriptions from StageAgent.com
 

1978 musicals
Broadway musicals
Musicals inspired by real-life events
Plays set in the 1970s
Plays set in Texas
Texas in fiction
Tony Award-winning musicals